Zapisano je u vremenu is the ninth studio album of Nedeljko Bajić Baja, and one of his most successful.

Track listing 
"Zapisano je u vremenu" (It is written in time)
"Romansa" (Romance)
"Radio"
"Crveni telefon" (Red telephone)
"Tip top"
"Zemlja ljubavi" (Land of love)
"Disco"
"Znam dobro" (I know well)
"Nemoguća misija" (Impossible mission)
"Ljubav godine" (Love of the year)
"Ludnica" (Mental institution)
"Moja prva ljubav" (My first love)

2007 albums